Paul Pierre Bontemps (16 November 1902 – 25 April 1981) was a French runner. He competed at the 1924 Paris Olympics in the 3,000 m steeplechase and in the flat 3,000 m team event, and finished in third and fourth place, respectively. He set an unofficial world record in the steeplechase a few weeks before the Games.

References

1902 births
1981 deaths
French male long-distance runners
Olympic bronze medalists for France
Athletes (track and field) at the 1924 Summer Olympics
Olympic athletes of France
Athletes from Paris
French male steeplechase runners
French male middle-distance runners
Medalists at the 1924 Summer Olympics
Olympic bronze medalists in athletics (track and field)
20th-century French people